The River Horner, also known as Horner Water, rises near Luccombe on Exmoor, Somerset, and flows past Porlock into Porlock Bay near Hurlstone Point on the Bristol Channel. The river flows into the sea though a shingle ridge at Bossington beach, where it forms part of the Porlock Ridge and Saltmarsh Site of Special Scientific Interest. When the river level is very high, flood water builds up behind the ridge, causing it to breach.

History 
Evidence that the river was previously diverted to power iron workings has been found. The remains of an iron hammer mill and 55m long, breached, embankment dam were excavated alongside the river in 1996.

References

Rivers of Somerset
Exmoor